Nobody's Bizzness is a French independent record label founded by Miss Kittin.

History
Nobody's Bizzness was founded in 2004 by French recording artist Miss Kittin.

Current Artists
Miss Kittin
The Hacker

See also
 List of record labels

External links
 Official site

French record labels
Vanity record labels
Electronic music record labels
Record labels established in 2004